The National Weather Service bulletin for the New Orleans region of 10:11 a.m., August 28, 2005, was a particularly dire warning issued by the local Weather Forecast Office in Slidell, Louisiana, warning of the devastation that Hurricane Katrina could wreak upon the Gulf Coast of the United States, and the torrent of pain, misery and suffering that would follow once the storm left the area.

An NWS assessment of its Hurricane Katrina activity found that because of "the unprecedented detail and foreboding nature of the language used, the statement helped
reinforce the actions of emergency management officials as they coordinated one of the largest evacuations in U.S. history." The bulletin "helped reinforce the message from emergency management officials for residents in southeast Louisiana and southern Mississippi to heed evacuation orders from local officials."

Background

On the evening of August 25, 2005, Hurricane Katrina made landfall as a Category 1 hurricane near the Miami-Dade–Broward county line in southern Florida and weakened into a tropical storm as a result. The next morning, after passing over the state, Tropical Storm Katrina moved into the Gulf of Mexico, and reintensified back to hurricane strength. As the hurricane passed over the warm waters of the Loop Current, the hurricane began to undergo rapid deepening.

At 11:00 p.m. EDT August 26, approximately 56 hours before Katrina's landfall near Buras, Louisiana, the National Hurricane Center had predicted that the Greater New Orleans area could face a direct hit by the storm. As New Orleans is located on the Mississippi River Delta and parts of the city are below sea level, a strong hurricane could have a devastating effect on the city. Previous warnings, such as the one made by the Houston Chronicle in 2001, told of a disaster that "would strand 250,000 people or more, and probably kill one of 10 left behind as the city drowned under 20 feet of water" following a severe hurricane making landfall on the city. Max Mayfield, who was the director of the National Hurricane Center at the time, indicated that the Mississippi/Louisiana area has "the greatest potential for nightmare scenarios," and that this has been known for at least the three decades he has worked at the NHC. Other publications, such as Popular Mechanics, Scientific American, and The Times-Picayune had given doomsday scenarios in which a sinking city would drown and its residents would be left homeless.

In 1965, Hurricane Betsy made landfall just south of New Orleans, causing widespread flooding in the city. As a result, a system of levees was authorized by Congress to handle future storm events. However, the protection given by this system was limited to hurricanes up to Category 3 intensity on the Saffir-Simpson Hurricane Scale.

Three days before Katrina's second and third landfalls, the National Hurricane Center began predicting that the storm would make landfall as a major hurricane. By the next morning, on August 27, the NHC issued a hurricane watch that included the New Orleans metro area, which was upgraded to a hurricane warning by 10:00 p.m. CDT that same evening. At this point, Katrina was a Category 3 hurricane with 115 mph (185 km/h) winds and about 335 miles (540 km) to the south-southeast of the Mississippi River's mouth.

Bulletin text
Over the course of the overnight hours of August 27, 2005, Hurricane Katrina rapidly strengthened, reaching Category 5 status by morning, with maximum sustained winds of 175 mph (280 km/h) by 10:00 am CDT on August 28. A few minutes later, at 10:11 a.m. CDT (1511 UTC), Robert Ricks, a meteorologist with the New Orleans/Baton Rouge NWS office, issued the following statement as part of the event synopsis text of an inland hurricane wind warning being issued:

A warning just as dire was issued at 4:13 p.m. CDT.

Impact
In the months following the storm, Congress appointed a bipartisan committee to investigate the response to Hurricane Katrina and the preparations prior to its landfall. The committee concluded that the forecasts given by the National Weather Service were timely, were not responsible for failures in other agencies, and were likely responsible for saving thousands of lives that would have otherwise been lost in the raging hurricane.

During an internal assessment by the National Weather Service, the 10:11 bulletin and its impact were analyzed. The report called the bulletin "a significant moment for the NWS during Katrina," as its detailed and explicit language did not have any precedent, though the message was based on a template designed by the Tampa Weather Office in the 1990s. The strongly worded statement urged residents to evacuate, and was highlighted by national news media. As a result, the level of detail was highlighted as an "innovative best practice" in the NWS assessment, which recommended issuing warnings with similar levels of detail in the future. The bulletin was described as "perhaps the most chilling ever issued" by the NWS. 

Ricks, a native of the Ninth Ward, later told NBC Nightly News that he wrote the bulletin based on his previous experiences with Betsy and Camille.  He also said that he was looking for statements to take out, but decided to leave the bulletin more or less intact because it seemed valid for a storm that he was convinced would be "the big one" longtime New Orleans residents had been predicting for some time.  He admitted that he and his colleagues hoped to have been wrong about just how powerful Katrina would become, "but our local expertise said otherwise." He added, "We always prepare for the big one, we just didn't think it was going to come this soon."

The bulletin, and the rosary that Ricks clutched as he and his fellow forecasters weathered the storm in their office, are both now in the National Museum of American History.

See also

Effects of Hurricane Katrina in New Orleans
Tropical cyclone watches and warnings

References

Tropical cyclone meteorology
Preparations for Hurricane Katrina
Weather warnings and advisories
Katrina NWS